Samuel Elisée Bridel-Brideri (28 November 1761 in Crassier, Vaud – 7 January 1828) was a Swiss-German bryologist.

He studied at the University of Lausanne, and at the age of 19 began work as a tutor to the princes of Saxe-Gotha-Altenburg. In 1804 he was appointed Geheimer Legationsrath to the Privy Council, and later on, he worked as a librarian in the city of Gotha.

He was the author of an important work on mosses titled Muscologia recentiorum (1797-1803), of which several supplements were issued in the ensuing years. Later on, he published the two-volume Bryologia universa (1826–27), which was an improved edition of his earlier work. In the latter work he introduced a new system for classification of mosses; a system that is no longer used.

The genus Bridelia was named in his honor by German botanist Carl Ludwig Willdenow (1765-1812). A portion of his herbarium is now housed at the Berlin Botanical Museum, and a number of his scientific papers are kept at the Forschungsbibliothek Gotha, Schloss Friedenstein in Gotha. Also, he was the author of Délassements poétiques, a well-received book of poetry.

References 
  translated biography @ Allgemeine Deutsche Biographie
 Pierer's Universal-Lexicon (translated biography)
 Parts of this article are based on a translation of an equivalent article at the Spanish Wikipedia.

1761 births
1828 deaths
People from Nyon District
19th-century Swiss botanists
Bryologists
18th-century Swiss botanists
University of Lausanne alumni